The Government Service Ensign is a defaced Blue Ensign flown by vessels owned by the British Ministry of Defence for which no other ensign is appropriate. It is most commonly seen flown by warships undergoing contractors' trials before being commissioned into the Royal Navy, and former Royal Maritime Auxiliary Service vessels now operated by Serco Denholm.

The Government Service Jack is a square flag of similar design.

History
When the Royal Navy was re-organized in 1864, and the Red, Blue and White squadrons were abolished, a Blue Ensign defaced with a horizontal anchor was designated the ensign of all auxiliary vessels owned by the Admiralty. It was originally named the Transport Ensign, but soon became known as the Admiralty Ensign. In 1905, the Royal Fleet Auxiliary (RFA) was formed, and, in 1922, was directed to fly this flag. (Up to that time, some captains had flown the Red Ensign.)

In 1968, the RFA was awarded its own ensign, similar to the Admiralty Ensign, but with a vertical anchor. In 1974, various units that provided harbour services were amalgamated into the Royal Maritime Auxiliary Service (RMAS), the Admiralty Ensign was renamed the Government Service Ensign and was flown by all Ministry of Defence-owned vessels that were not part of the Royal Navy, RFAS or RMAS. In 1996, most RMAS vessels were transferred to Serco Denholm, which operated them under a commercial contract, flying the Government Service Ensign. In 2008, all remaining RMAS vessels were transferred to Serco Denholm and the RMAS was abolished.

See also
British Ensigns
List of flags

References

Flags of the United Kingdom
Blue Ensigns